The Ferocious Saladin (Italian: Il feroce Saladino) is a 1937 Italian "white-telephones" comedy film directed by Mario Bonnard and starring Angelo Musco, Alida Valli and Lino Carenzio. The film was made at Cinecittà in Rome. On 28 April 1937, Benito Mussolini visited the newly completed studio. Along with the historical epic Scipio Africanus, this was one of the films he saw being made. The film, a vehicle for the Sicilian comedian Angelo Musco, is about an unsuccessful old comedian forced to find another work. While he is selling cakes in a theatre, the audience discover the highly sought-after collectible cards of "The Ferocious Saladin". Inspired by the event, the comedian sets up a successful comic piece on stage.

The film's sets were designed by art director Alfredo Montori.

Cast
Angelo Musco as il professor Pompeo Darly / Il Feroce Saladino
Alida Valli as Dora Florida / Sulamita
Lino Carenzio as Gastone, il fine dicitore
Mario Mazza as l'acrobata Johnson / Tarzan
Rosina Anselmi as Amalia, la moglie di Pompeo
Maria Donati as Yvonne, la tenutaria della pensione per artisti
Nicola Maldacea as ciambellano
Nino Marchesini as il commendator Fani
Luigi Zerbinati as il segretario di Fani
Carlo Duse as il regista del teatro di rivista
Giuseppe Pierozzi as un signore a teatro
Claudio Ermelli as l'usciere del teatro
Eduardo Passarelli as un signore ipnotizzato
Paolo Ferrara as Girolamo Mipaghi
Eugenio Colombo as l'amministratore del teatro
Checco Durante as il direttore del teatro Vittoria
Alfredo Martinelli as il direttore d'orchestra del Teatro Apollo
Pina Gallini as una signora sul treno
Alberto Sordi as l'uomo nascosto sotto il costume del leone
Elli Parvo as l'attrice truccata all'orientale
Giuliana Gianni as una ballerina
Margot Pellegrinetti as il soprano
Carlo Cecchi as il signore calvo che compra le caramelle a teatro
Pina Renzi as l'attrice nervosa dal parlare incomprensibile
Armando Fineschi as il marito dell'attrice nervosa
Rocco D'Assunta as il conte di Montholon
Carla Candiani as la contessa Albina di Montholon

References

Bibliography 
 Gundle, Stephen. Mussolini's Dream Factory: Film Stardom in Fascist Italy. Berghahn Books, 2013.

External links 
 

1937 films
Italian comedy films
Italian black-and-white films
1937 comedy films
1930s Italian-language films
Films directed by Mario Bonnard
Films shot at Cinecittà Studios
1930s Italian films